Munraj Pal (born 21 April 1976) is an English former professional snooker player.

Career

Pal turned professional in 1995, but fell off the tour two years later in 1997. He re-qualified during the 1997/1998 season, but lost his professional status again in 2001; forced once more to enter qualifying tournaments in the 2001/2002 season, he competed on the tour for a third stint between 2002 and 2004. At this point, although he had reached his highest-ever ranking of 85th, Pal was relegated again.

He got back onto the professional tour in 2007/2008 by finishing fifth on the Pontin's International Open Series Order of Merit, winning one PIOS event in 2006.

Recording his best-ever finish in reaching the last 48 at the 2001 Scottish Open – where he lost 1–5 to James Wattana – Pal practiced with David Roe and Michael Holt during his career.

After losing his place on tour for the fourth time in 2008, Pal retired from competitive snooker, aged 32.

Career finals

Non-ranking finals: 1

Amateur finals: 1 (1 title)

External links
 
 Profile on globalsnooker.co.uk
 Results & Statistics on CueTracker

English snooker players
1976 births
Living people
English people of Indian descent
Sportspeople from Derby